Robert Daymond Howard (né Niles; born March 11, 1982) is an American voice actor who is mostly known for his roles in audiobooks, video games, and animation, best known for voicing Jesse Cosay in the second season of Infinity Train, Spider-Man in various Marvel media, Goro Akechi in Persona 5, Young Cricket, Mike, and Orbulon in WarioWare Gold, and the Eighth Brother in the Star Wars animated series Star Wars Rebels.

Biography 
Robert Daymond Howard was born Robert Daymond Niles in Chesterfield, Missouri on March 11, 1982, the son of Laura Marks and Robert Niles. His mother is of German descent, while his father has Native American (Apache) ancestry. His father left the family when Daymond was an infant, leaving his mother to raise him with the help of her parents in Warrenton, Missouri. He took an interest in acting and in 1992, participated in the play On Golden Pond.

After Daymond's mother remarried, he changed his last name to Howard, his stepfather's surname, and his family moved to St. Charles, Missouri. In 2000, he attended Webster University, but later transferred to the University of Nevada, Las Vegas, where he graduated with a BFA in Theatre Performance in 2004. He taught and performed at the Nevada Conservatory Theatre, which was related to UNLV, and received his MFA at UNLV in 2007.

Career 
In 2007, Daymond moved to Los Angeles, where he worked with the New York Film Company and Quixote Films. He also founded a voice-over company called Shock & Awesome Audio. In 2010, he started doing more voice-over work; by 2011, he was working full-time in voice acting for cartoons, anime, and video games.

Daymond voiced the lead character in various cartoons: SwaySway in the Nickelodeon program Breadwinners, Blake Myers in the Nick cartoon Get Blake!, and the title character in Marvel’s Spider-Man which first aired on Disney XD in 2017.

In anime and video games, Daymond's roles have included: Tuxedo Mask in the Viz Media re-dub of Sailor Moon, Mumen Rider in One-Punch Man, Hubert von Vestra in Fire Emblem: Three Houses, Sorey in Tales of Zestiria, Goro Akechi in  Persona 5, Lloyd Bannings in The Legend of Heroes: Trails of Cold Steel II and IV, Joe Kido in Digimon Adventure tri. and Prompto Argentum in Final Fantasy XV, Fret in Halo: Infinite, Smokey Brown in JoJo's Bizarre Adventure, Chrollo Lucilfer in Hunter x Hunter, Kayn in League of Legends as well as The Seven Deadly Sins, Adam Bindewald in Godzilla: Planet of the Monsters, Godzilla: City on the Edge of Battle, and Godzilla: The Planet Eater, and Chai in "Hi-Fi Rush."

From June to August 2021, Daymond appeared on Exandria Unlimited, a spinoff limited series of the web series Critical Role. He played Dorian Storm, an air genasi bard. He continued to play Dorian in Critical Role's third campaign for the first fourteen episodes. In March 2022, he reprised the role in the two part special Exandria Unlimited: Kymal. Daymond is also one of the narrators for the audiobook edition of the novel Critical Role: Vox Machina – Kith & Kin (2021).
In 2023, he voices the main character, Chai, in the recently released rhythm action game Hi-Fi Rush created by Tango Gameworks

Personal life 
Daymond met Megan Lynn Strand in 2004 while they were studying at the University of Nevada, Las Vegas. They reside in Los Angeles, where they spent eight years in an on-and-off relationship before becoming engaged in 2017. They were married on April 7, 2019. Their first child, a daughter named Lynnyx Lola Ann Howard, was born on June 7, 2018. Their second child, a son named Rohan Eldon Howard, was born on January 9, 2021.

Filmography

Anime

Television

Films

Video games

Web

References

External links 
 
 
 

1982 births
Living people
American male video game actors
American male voice actors
American people of Apache descent
American voice directors
Audiobook narrators
Male actors from Missouri
People from Warrenton, Missouri
Television producers from Missouri
University of Nevada, Las Vegas alumni
20th-century American male actors
21st-century American male actors